Lewes Rugby Football Club, was founded in 1930 and runs several rugby teams at various ages and competitive levels, including two senior men's sides, with the 1st XV currently playing in the Sussex 1 (level 9 of the English rugby union system) following their relegation from London 3 South East at the end of the 2018–19 season.  Additional the club operates two senior women's sides, with the Ladies 1st XV currently playing in the Championship 2 South East league.

View images of Lewes RFC

Lewes RFC's home ground is the Stanley Turner Ground, Lewes.

In 2008 the club working in partnership with Lewes District Council and the Sussex Rugby Football Union offered young people in the area the chance to learn and take park in Tag rugby as a means to increasing the profile of the sport in the area.

Club Honours

Men's
London 3 South East champions: 1996–97
London 2 (south-east v south-west) promotion playoff winners: 2003–04
Sussex Spitfire 1 champions: 2015–16

Women's
 Women's Junior Cup winners: 2016–2017

References

External links
Club website

See also
Lewes Priory Cricket Club

English rugby union teams
Rugby union in East Sussex